Body Talk is the seventh studio album by Swedish singer Robyn, released on 22 November 2010 by Konichiwa Records. Robyn first announced in early 2010 that she would release three mini-albums throughout the course of 2010. However, it was later announced that a full-length album would be released instead of a third mini-album. The first two mini-albums of what was dubbed the Body Talk series, Body Talk Pt. 1 and Body Talk Pt. 2, were released in June and September 2010. While being a separate studio album in its own right, the full-length release also serves as a compilation album, containing the "best songs" from the first two entries in the Body Talk series in addition to five new songs. In certain territories, the new songs were also available separately as an extended play released the same day, titled Body Talk Pt. 3. The four songs and two acoustic versions from the project that were excluded from the original track listing were later included on the German iTunes and 2019 Record Store Day vinyl versions of the album.

In October 2019, the album was placed at number eight on Pitchfork list of "The 200 Best Albums of the 2010s". In 2020, the album was ranked 196 on Rolling Stones list of 500 greatest albums of all time. As of 2013, combined sales of the three parts of Body Talk series were 170,000 copies in the United States.

Background and development

In an interview with Swedish magazine Bon, Robyn announced that she had plans to release three new albums in 2010. She said, "I got all these great songs so why not? [...] It's been 5 years since Robyn and I didn't want to wait with a release until they are all recorded, so I decided to start putting them out right away." Robyn told Popjustice journalist Peter Robinson, "It's been a long time since I actually made a record! And I was thinking of how to shorten that time down and Eric, my manager, came up with the idea of what if I just start releasing songs, then I can tour them, then I can make some more songs. We started working like that. I think once it starts it will make more sense – you can just keep releasing stuff without the long breaks." Robyn collaborated with Swedish producer Max Martin on the song "Time Machine". Martin was responsible for producing Robyn's US breakthrough hits "Do You Know (What It Takes)" and "Show Me Love", which both charted inside the top 10 of the Billboard Hot 100 in 1996 and 1997. She said of the collaboration: "It was nostalgic to go back into the studio together. For me, it's perfect timing – I've come full circle. It's a way for me to show that I'm not trying to distance myself from where I come from. It's still all about the songs."

Release and promotion
On 20 October 2010, Robyn announced the details of Body Talk on her official website, along with the track listing and artwork. She described the album as the "turbo version of the Body Talk album", as it includes five songs from each previous Body Talk album along with five new songs.

Singles
Robyn announced the release of the single, "Indestructible", on 13 October 2010. An acoustic version appeared on her previous album, Body Talk Pt. 2. The song was released on 1 November 2010 in Scandinavia and one day later in the United States. It is co-written by Klas Åhlund, and has been described as a "pulsating full power version [that] takes every ounce of that emotion and wraps it up in another exceptional disco-pop record worthy of any dance-floor or passion-laden sing-a-long." The second single, "Call Your Girlfriend", was released on 1 April 2011.

Critical reception

Body Talk received acclaim from most music critics. At Metacritic, which assigns a normalised rating out of 100 to reviews from mainstream critics, the album received an average score of 86, based on 19 reviews, which indicates "universal acclaim". Music critic Jonathan Keefe from Slant Magazine said the album is "a testament to Robyn's truly forward-thinking take on contemporary pop music and to her rare ability to infuse chilly, futuristic soundscapes with genuine emotion and soul." Keefe also said that Body Talk "impresses for its thematic focus and laser-precise editing" and that the album is "one of the year's finest, most progressive pop albums". The A.V. Club also felt that the album is "hands-down the best dance-pop album of the year," and praised it as "euphoric, personal, and inspirational to the last beat", saying that it "proves there's still room for smart, mature songwriting and heartfelt performance in the high-gloss world of club music," and noting the presence of "real emotion (...) among the ones and zeros of electronic music."

Entertainment Weekly said that "Spectacular Swedish import Robyn continues to languish in the cult-act remainder bin, but these 15 excellently curated tracks deserve to change that." Pitchfork stamped it with its "Best New Music" label. Rolling Stone said it was "the best dance-pop album of 2010", with every song being "both immaculately catchy and packed with quirks". musicOMH said that Body Talk "shows just how easily [Robyn] can churn out hits more frequently than labels can process production teams." AllMusic music critic Heather Phares said that "Releasing that much new music within six months was a feat in and of itself, but the fact that each part of Body Talk was so consistent made the whole project even more impressive." Phares said that the album's appeal "isn't just experimental: by picking the best of the project's songs, it feels like a greatest-hits collection and brand new album rolled into one."

Accolades

Body Talk was chosen the 2nd best album released in 2010 by Popjustice and Slant Magazine, the 3rd best album released in 2010 by Entertainment Weekly, MTV and Billboard, the 10th best album of 2010 by both The A.V. Club and Spin, and was also selected as the 14th best album of 2010, by Rolling Stone. Pitchfork listed Body Talk as the eighth best album of the 2010s.  In 2020, Rolling Stone ranked the album number 196 in the reboot of their 500 Greatest Albums of All Time list.

Track listing

Notes
  signifies a co-producer
  signifies an additional producer
 On the US and Canadian versions of the album, the radio version of "Dancing On My Own" is the opening track, with the rest of the songs following.

Charts

Weekly charts

Year-end charts

Certifications

Release history

Body Talk Pt. 3Body Talk Pt. 3''' is the third extended play (EP) by Swedish singer Robyn. It was released on 22 November 2010, simultaneously with Robyn's seventh studio album, Body Talk'' (2010). In November 2011, the EP garnered a Grammy Award nomination for Best Dance/Electronic Album, while the second single, "Call Your Girlfriend", received a nomination for Best Dance Recording.

Track listing

Notes
  signifies a co-producer

Charts

Release history

Notes

References

2010 compilation albums
Body Talk Pt. 3
Albums produced by Klas Åhlund
Albums produced by Diplo
Albums produced by Max Martin
Albums produced by Shellback (record producer)
Albums recorded at Record Plant (Los Angeles)
Europop albums
Interscope Records albums
Robyn albums
Body Talk Pt. 3